Otis Allen Davis (September 24, 1920 – July 23, 2007) was an American Major League Baseball player for the Brooklyn Dodgers in . Davis, whose nickname was "Scat", made just one appearance as a pinch runner on April 22 against the Boston Braves at Ebbets Field.

In the bottom of the ninth inning, with Brooklyn trailing 4–2, leadoff man Eddie Stanky, pinch hitting, drew a base on balls, and Davis ran for him. He moved to second base when the next hitter, Bob Ramazzotti, also walked, then he was sacrifice bunted to third by Billy Herman. The next Dodger hitter, Pete Reiser, doubled to score both Davis and Ramazzotti, tying the game at four. The game went into extra innings, and Brooklyn won it in its half of the tenth frame, 5–4.

He was an outfielder in the minor leagues from 1942 to 1948 and finished his career as the manager of the Abilene Blue Sox of the West Texas–New Mexico League in 1948.

References

External links

1920 births
2007 deaths
Abilene Blue Sox players
Allentown Cardinals players
Baseball players from Arkansas
Brooklyn Dodgers players
Fort Worth Cats players
Greenville Spinners players
Hamilton Red Wings (baseball) players
Jamestown Falcons players
Lynchburg Cardinals players
Montreal Royals players
Minor league baseball managers
Nashua Dodgers players
People from Charleston, Arkansas
Pueblo Dodgers players
Rochester Red Wings players